Elaphidion irroratum is a species of beetle in the family Cerambycidae. It was described by Carl Linnaeus in his 1767 12th edition of Systema Naturae.

Description
Head very dark brown, almost black; front dappled with cream colour. Antennae dark brown, and about the length of the insect; having spines at each joint, except that next the head. Thorax spineless, brownish black, with white patches on its sides; and, when viewed through a microscope, punctured. Scutellum very small, and nearly triangular. Elytra brownish black, margined at the sides and suture, with whitish patches thereon, punctured; having two spines at the extremity of each. Abdomen and breast black, and covered with short grey hairs like pile. Legs reddish brown, with a small spine at the tip of each of the femora (except the fore ones), and another at the tips of the tibiae. Length of body  inch (19 mm).

References

irroratum
Beetles described in 1767
Taxa named by Carl Linnaeus
Descriptions from Illustrations of Exotic Entomology